Full Auto is a 2006 vehicular combat racing game for the Xbox 360 developed by Pseudo Interactive and published by Sega. The game was originally developed by Pseudo Interactive for the PC. It features destructible environments and (in certain races) a mode called "Unwreck" which rewinds time if the player makes a mistake and wants to try again. The game was removed from Games on Demand in August 2012.

A sequel, Full Auto 2: Battlelines, was released exclusively for the PlayStation 3 and PlayStation Portable.

Vehicles
In Full Auto, there are four vehicle classes. Each has its own abilities, strengths and weaknesses. There is Class A, which are faster, but have less durability than their counterparts. Class B is the middle class of vehicles having a fair amount of speed, and decent durability. Class C consists of slow, but highly durable vehicles. A fourth class, Class S, is home to the "ultimate" class where its vehicle is very powerful, fast and durable. Note that in online play all players, regardless of how far they have gotten in the career mode, have access to all vehicles in whatever class the host of the room determines. However, tuneable weapons are not permitted on Live play unless they are unlocked from the career mode.

Weapons
The weapons of Full Auto are mounted on the vehicles, and have unlimited ammunition, but require a cooldown period if fired too quickly. The weapons become active after approximately 10 seconds of racing into the game.

Reception

The game received "average" reviews according to the review aggregation website Metacritic. In Japan, Famitsu gave it a score of 27 out of 40, while Famitsu X360 gave it a score of two eights and two sevens for a total of 30 out of 40.

Theo Wells of The Times gave the game four stars out of five, saying: "Graphically, the level of detail in the tracks is simply stunning compared with the scenery on Burnout, a reflection of the superiority of the new Xbox over the old." Michael Donahoe of Maxim similarly gave it four stars: "A variety of wheels and weaponry ensures there'll be loads of destruction, while the online option gives this gas-guzzler some extra mileage." However, Jason Hill of The Sydney Morning Herald gave it two-and-a-half stars out of five: "A big selection of different events suggests variety but the action soon becomes repetitive. Full Autos main competitor, Burnout, offers significantly more diversity in its challenges."

References

External links
 Pseudo Interactive
 

2006 video games
Multiplayer online games
Sega Games franchises
Sega video games
Vehicular combat games
Video games developed in Canada
Video games scored by Rom Di Prisco
Xbox 360 games
Xbox 360-only games
Multiplayer and single-player video games
Pseudo Interactive games